Zingari (English:Gypsies) is a 1920 Italian silent film directed by Mario Almirante and starring Italia Almirante-Manzini.

Cast
 Italia Almirante-Manzini as Vielka  
 Joaquín Carrasco as Il curato  
 Alfonso Cassini as Jammadar 
 Amleto Novelli as Sindel  
 Franz Sala as Gudlo  
 Rosetta Solari as Radscia 
 Arturo Stinga as Leandro Klotz

References

Bibliography
Moliterno, Gino. The A to Z of Italian Cinema. Scarecrow Press, 2009.

External links

1920 films
1920s Italian-language films
Films directed by Mario Almirante
Italian silent feature films
Italian black-and-white films